The Visaginas Municipality is one of the 60 municipalities of Lithuania, situated in the north-east of the country. It consists of the city of Visaginas (administrative centre of the municipality), 16 villages (kaimai) and one farmstead (viensėdis). 

It has significant Russian minority population in Lithuania, with half of the population claiming Russian ethnicity.

History 

The municipality was formally established on 19 July 1994 as the Visaginas City Municipality (Visagino miesto savivaldybė) and came into actual existence following the local election on 25 March 1995. Initially the municipality was composed only of the city of Visaginas, but on 1 January 2003 its area was expanded by absorbing a part of the Ignalina District Municipality, and the Visaginas City Municipality was renamed to what it is known as now.

References

External links 
 Official website of Visaginas Municipality

 
Municipalities of Lithuania